The Stefan–Boltzmann law describes the power radiated from a black body in terms of its temperature.  Specifically, the Stefan–Boltzmann law states that the total energy radiated per unit surface area of a black body across all wavelengths per unit time  (also known as the black-body radiant emittance) is directly proportional to the fourth power of the black body's thermodynamic temperature T:

The constant of proportionality σ, called the Stefan–Boltzmann constant, is derived from other known physical constants. Since 2019, the value of the constant is

where k is the Boltzmann constant, h is the Planck constant, and c is the speed of light in vacuum. The radiance from a specified angle of view (watts per square metre per steradian) is given by

A body that does not absorb all incident radiation (sometimes known as a grey body) emits less total energy than a black body and is characterized by an emissivity, :

The radiant emittance  has dimensions of energy flux (energy per unit time per unit area), and the SI units of measure are joules per second per square metre, or equivalently, watts per square metre. The SI unit for absolute temperature T is the kelvin.   is the emissivity of the grey body; if it is a perfect blackbody, . In the still more general (and realistic) case, the emissivity depends on the wavelength, .

To find the total power radiated from an object, multiply by its surface area, :

Wavelength- and subwavelength-scale particles, metamaterials, and other nanostructures are not subject to ray-optical limits and may be designed to exceed the Stefan–Boltzmann law.

History 
In 1864, John Tyndall presented measurements of the infrared emission by a platinum filament and the corresponding color of the filament. 
The proportionality to the fourth power of the absolute temperature was deduced by Josef Stefan (1835–1893) in 1877 on the basis of Tyndall's experimental measurements, in the article Über die Beziehung zwischen der Wärmestrahlung und der Temperatur (On the relationship between thermal radiation and temperature) in the Bulletins from the sessions of the Vienna Academy of Sciences.

A derivation of the law  from theoretical considerations was presented by Ludwig Boltzmann (1844–1906) in 1884, drawing upon the work of Adolfo Bartoli. 
Bartoli in 1876 had derived the existence of radiation pressure from the principles of thermodynamics. Following Bartoli, Boltzmann considered an ideal heat engine using electromagnetic radiation instead of an ideal gas as  working matter.

The law was almost immediately experimentally verified. Heinrich Weber in 1888 pointed out deviations at higher temperatures, but perfect accuracy within measurement uncertainties was confirmed up to temperatures of 1535 K by 1897.
The law, including the theoretical prediction of the Stefan–Boltzmann constant as a function of the speed of light, the Boltzmann constant and the Planck constant, is a direct consequence of Planck's law as formulated in 1900.

As of the 2019 redefinition of SI base units, which fixes the values of the Boltzmann constant k, the Planck constant h, and the speed of light c, the Stefan–Boltzmann constant is exactly

σ = .

The numerical value of the Stefan–Boltzmann constant is different in other systems of units. For example, in thermochemistry it is often expressed in cal⋅cm−2⋅day−1⋅K−4:

Likewise, in US customary units the Stefan–Boltzmann constant is

Examples

Temperature of the Sun 

With his law, Stefan also determined the temperature of the Sun's surface. He inferred from the data of Jacques-Louis Soret (1827–1890) that the energy flux density from the Sun is 29 times greater than the energy flux density of a certain warmed metal lamella (a thin plate). A round lamella was placed at such a distance from the measuring device that it would be seen at the same angular diameter as the Sun. Soret estimated the temperature of the lamella to be approximately 1900 °C to 2000 °C. Stefan surmised that ⅓ of the energy flux from the Sun is absorbed by the Earth's atmosphere, so he took for the correct Sun's energy flux a value 3/2 times greater than Soret's value, namely 29 × 3/2 = 43.5.

Precise measurements of atmospheric absorption were not made until 1888 and 1904. The temperature Stefan obtained was a median value of previous ones, 1950 °C and the absolute thermodynamic one 2200 K. As 2.574 = 43.5, it follows from the law that the temperature of the Sun is 2.57 times greater than the temperature of the lamella, so Stefan got a value of 5430 °C or 5700 K. This was the first sensible value for the temperature of the Sun. Before this, values ranging from as low as 1800 °C to as high as 13,000,000 °C were claimed. The lower value of 1800 °C was determined by Claude Pouillet (1790–1868) in 1838 using the Dulong–Petit law. Pouillet also took just half the value of the Sun's correct energy flux.

Temperature of stars 

The temperature of stars other than the Sun can be approximated using a similar means by treating the emitted energy as a black body radiation. So:

 

where L is the luminosity, σ is the Stefan–Boltzmann constant, R is the stellar radius and T is the effective temperature. This formula can then be rearranged to calculate the temperature:

 

or alternatively the radius:

 

The same formulae can also be simplified to compute the parameters relative to the Sun:

 

 

 

where  is the solar radius, and so forth. They can also be rewritten in terms of the surface area A and radiant emittance :

 

 

 

where  and 

With the Stefan–Boltzmann law, astronomers can easily infer the radii of stars. The law is also met in the thermodynamics of black holes in so-called Hawking radiation.

Effective temperature of the Earth 

Similarly we can calculate the effective temperature of the Earth T⊕ by equating the energy received from the Sun and the energy radiated by the Earth, under the black-body approximation (Earth's own production of energy being small enough to be negligible).  The luminosity of the Sun, L⊙, is given by:

At Earth, this energy is passing through a sphere with a radius of a0, the distance between the Earth and the Sun, and the irradiance (received power per unit area) is given by

The radiant flux (i.e. solar power) absorbed by the Earth is thus given by:

Because the Stefan–Boltzmann law uses a fourth power, it has a stabilizing effect on the exchange and the flux emitted by Earth tends to be equal to the flux absorbed, close to the steady state where:

T⊕ can then be found:

where T⊙ is the temperature of the Sun, R⊙ the radius of the Sun, and a0 is the distance between the Earth and the Sun. This gives an effective temperature of 6 °C on the surface of the Earth, assuming that it perfectly absorbs all emission falling on it and has no atmosphere.

The Earth has an albedo of 0.3, meaning that 30% of the solar radiation that hits the planet gets scattered back into space without absorption.  The effect of albedo on temperature can be approximated by assuming that the energy absorbed is multiplied by 0.7, but that the planet still radiates as a black body (the latter by definition of effective temperature, which is what we are calculating).  This approximation reduces the temperature by a factor of 0.71/4, giving 255 K (−18 °C).

The above temperature is Earth's as seen from space, not ground temperature but an average over all emitting bodies of Earth from surface to high altitude. Because of the greenhouse effect, the Earth's actual average surface temperature is about 288 K (15 °C), which is higher than the 255 K effective temperature, and even higher than the 279 K temperature that a black body would have.

In the above discussion, we have assumed that the whole surface of the earth is at one temperature. Another interesting question is to ask what the temperature of a blackbody surface on the earth would be assuming that it reaches equilibrium with the sunlight falling on it. This of course depends on the angle of the sun on the surface and on how much air the sunlight has gone through. When the sun is at the zenith and the surface is horizontal, the irradiance can be as high as 1120 W/m2. The Stefan–Boltzmann law then gives a temperature of

or 102 °C. (Above the atmosphere, the result is even higher: 394 K.) We can think of the earth's surface as "trying" to reach equilibrium temperature during the day, but being cooled by the atmosphere, and "trying" to reach equilibrium with starlight and possibly moonlight at night, but being warmed by the atmosphere.

Origination

Thermodynamic derivation of the energy density 

The fact that the energy density of the box containing radiation is proportional to  can be derived using thermodynamics. This derivation uses the relation between the radiation pressure p and the internal energy density , a relation that can be shown using the form of the electromagnetic stress–energy tensor. This relation is:

 

Now, from the fundamental thermodynamic relation

 

 

The last equality comes from the following Maxwell relation:

 

From the definition of energy density it follows that

 

where the energy density of radiation only depends on the temperature, therefore

 

Now, the equality

 

after substitution of   Meanwhile, the pressure is the rate of momentum change per unit area.  Since the momentum of a photon is the same as the energy divided by the speed of light,

 
where the 1/3 factor comes from the projection of the momentum transfer onto the normal to the wall of the container.

After separating the differentials the equality becomes

 

Derivation from Planck's law 

The law can be derived by considering a small flat black body surface radiating out into a half-sphere. This derivation uses spherical coordinates, with θ as the zenith angle and φ as the azimuthal angle; and the small flat blackbody surface lies on the xy-plane, where θ = /2.

The intensity of the light emitted from the blackbody surface is given by Planck's law,

where
 is the amount of power per unit surface area per unit solid angle per unit frequency emitted at a frequency  by a black body at temperature T.
 is the Planck constant
 is the speed of light, and
 is the Boltzmann constant.

The Stefan–Boltzmann law gives the power emitted per unit area of the emitting body,

Note that the cosine appears because black bodies are Lambertian (i.e. they obey Lambert's cosine law), meaning that the intensity observed along the sphere will be the actual intensity times the cosine of the zenith angle.
To derive the Stefan–Boltzmann law, we must integrate  over the half-sphere and integrate  from 0 to ∞.

Then we plug in for I:

To evaluate this integral, do a substitution,

which gives:

The integral on the right is standard and goes by many names: it is a particular case of a Bose–Einstein integral, the polylogarithm, or the Riemann zeta function .

Finally, this proof started out only considering a small flat surface. However, any differentiable surface can be approximated by a collection of small flat surfaces. So long as the geometry of the surface does not cause the blackbody to reabsorb its own radiation, the total energy radiated is just the sum of the energies radiated by each surface; and the total surface area is just the sum of the areas of each surface—so this law holds for all convex blackbodies, too, so long as the surface has the same temperature throughout.  The law extends to radiation from non-convex bodies by using the fact that the convex hull of a black body radiates as though it were itself a black body.

Energy density
The total energy density U can be similarly calculated, except the integration is over the whole sphere and there is no cosine, and the energy flux (U c) should be divided by the velocity c to give the energy density U:

Thus, in total:

The product  is sometimes known as the radiation constant or radiation density constant.

See also 
Black-body radiation
Rayleigh–Jeans law
Planck's law
Sakuma–Hattori equation
Radó von Kövesligethy

Notes

References 
 
 

Laws of thermodynamics
Power laws
Heat transfer
Ludwig Boltzmann